The 2018 FFA Cup Final was the fifth final of the FFA Cup, Australia's main football cup competition. The match was contested between Adelaide United and Sydney FC, in a rematch of the 2017 FFA Cup Final which Sydney FC won. Coopers Stadium in Adelaide hosted the game.

The match was broadcast live on Fox Sports.

Road to the final

Adelaide United's progress started at home against fellow A-League side Central Coast Mariners. In a match held at Marden Sports Complex, they won 3–0 through goals to Jordan Elsey, debutant Mirko Boland and Craig Goodwin. The other three wins to take Adelaide to the Final were over National Premier Leagues teams, and as a result all played away from home under competition rules. Firstly, another Craig Goodwin goal saw Adelaide defeat Queensland Lions 1–0 in Brisbane. This was followed by a 2–0 win over APIA Leichhardt in the quarterfinals in Sydney, with Goodwin and Boland again on the scoresheet. In the semifinals, Adelaide drew the only remaining National Premier Leagues side: Bentleigh Greens. They won 2–0 in Melbourne, with goals to Jordan Elsey and Ben Halloran putting them into the final. The result also meant that Adelaide United were still yet to concede a goal in the 2018 FFA Cup.

Sydney FC commenced their 2018 Cup campaign with three wins over National Premier Leagues sides. They began with a win over fellow Sydney side Rockdale City Suns in the Round of 32. Rockdale City Suns had opened the scoring before four consecutive Sydney FC goals, including two to captain Alex Brosque, secured a 4–2 win. In the round of sixteen, Sydney FC travelled to Queensland to play Cairns FC. Again, they fell behind as the NPL side opened the scoring, but second half goals to Brosque (a penalty) and Trent Buhagiar saw Sydney FC win 2–1. Avondale FC were their quarterfinals, where two goals to Buhagiar in the first half saw the Sky Blues in the lead. However, Avondale FC fought back strongly in the second half, scoring twice to take the game to extra time. Goals to Milos Ninkovic and Adam Le Fondre gave Sydney FC an eventual 4–2 win. In the semifinals, Sydney FC faced their first A-League opposition of the tournament: Western Sydney Wanderers in a Sydney Derby. The game was played at Penrith Stadium. After a scoreless first half, a goal to Buhagiar, a free kick from Siem de Jong and a penalty from Adam Le Fondre saw the Sky Blues move on to the Final.

Pre-match

Venue selection
This was the first season to see the Final host team decided by random draw, rather than by Football Federation Australia selection. Adelaide were drawn to host the game, with the match to be played at Coopers Stadium, their home ground.

Analysis
Sydney FC were the reigning Champions coming into the match, having beaten Adelaide 2–1 after extra time in the 2017 FFA Cup Final.

Sydney had also reached the 2016 Final where they had lost to Melbourne City, making this their third consecutive FFA Cup Final Appearance. Sydney would become the first side to win the FFA Cup by winning every game away from home if they were to be victorious. This tournament included the first competitive matches for new Sydney coach Steve Corica, following the departure of Graham Arnold to coach Australia.

Other than the 2017 Final, Adelaide's other previous final appearance was in the 2014 edition, when they defeated Perth Glory 1–0 to win the inaugural FFA Cup.

The two sides played out a 1–1 draw in the opening match of the 2018–19 A-League in Adelaide eleven days prior to the final.

Match

Details

Statistics

References

External links
 FFA Cup official website

FFA Cup
2018 in Australian soccer
Adelaide United FC matches
Sydney FC matches
Soccer in Adelaide
October 2018 sports events in Australia
Sports competitions in Adelaide
2010s in Adelaide
Australia Cup finals